The 2014 Perth 400 was a motor race meeting for the Australian sedan-based V8 Supercars. It was the fifth event of the 2014 International V8 Supercars Championship. It was held on the weekend of 16–18 May at the Barbagallo Raceway, near Wanneroo, Western Australia.

References 

Barbagallo
May 2014 sports events in Australia